Unforgiven is the third album by rapper, X-Raided. It was released in 1998 for Blackmarket Records and features production from X-Raided, The Verbal Tek/Bomb Productions, RAW and DJ Shareil.  Unforgiven was X-Raided's first album to make it to the Billboard charts, reaching number 14 on the Top Heatseekers and number 54 on the Top R&B/Hip-Hop Albums.

X-Raided worked on Unforgiven while serving 31-years to life for murder at Salinas Valley State Prison in Soledad, California. Unlike his previous album which contained low quality vocal tracks recorded over the phone, X-Raided used a DAT recorder for Unforgiven. The DAT recordings were then taken to a studio by the producer so that beats could be added.

Background
X-Raided recorded vocals for his previous album, Xorcist, over the phone from Sacramento County Jail. The clarity of the vocal recordings that went into The Unforgiven album suggest that it was made using more sophisticated equipment. It later turned out that this was due to a guard(s) helping X-Raided by sending messages to the outside, bringing him beats to hear and taking his tracks that were recorded while in prison to Black Market Records. Vibe (August 1998) reported, "The Unforgiven is culled from 65 tracks recorded onto a DAT, with beats added afterwards at a studio." Post-production was done at a house by producer DJ VerbalTek. He sent the music equipment necessary for recording; a microphone used to clip on in interviews, a tape recorder and an electronic metronome. 
 
The final album featured only fourteen completed songs from the previously reported "65 tracks." The state of California targeted the album and tried to have it pulled from stores, claiming that it fell under the Son of Sam law. In retaliation, X-Raided surreptitiously released, under the pseudonym Nefarious, a compilation album of out-takes and tracks recorded during the aforementioned The Unforgiven tracking sessions. X-Raised chose the moniker Nefarious because the prosecutor in his trial referred to him as nefarious in attempts to paint him in a negative light to the jury. The album, titled Speak of the Devil: The Unreleased Verses, features tracks that were recorded during the original The Unforgiven sessions but weren't included on the original Volume I.

Track listing
"Madman Intro"- 0:37
"Misanthropy"- 5:36
"Unforgiven"- 3:30
"Who Is Ya'll Niggas"- 4:23
"Spitten Venom"- 3:20
"Mortal Combat"- 4:31
"Macaframa"- 5:26
"Take Flight"- 4:48
"Cemetery Fulla G's"- 3:16
"Dead On Arrival Pt. 1"- 4:26
"Land Of The Lost"- 4:40
"Kick It 2-Nite"- 3:14
"Mama's Pride & Joy"- 4:35
"Whatever It Took"- 3:34
"On The Rise"- 4:48
"Outro"- 1:05

References

1998 albums
X-Raided albums